The European Certification and Qualification Association is a not-for-profit association that aims to unify the certification processes for various professions. It is joining institutions and thousands of professionals from all over Europe and abroad. The ECQA offers the certification of participants for numerous professions. Currently, 30 professions are active and some new professions are currently being developed. ECQA services are being offered in 24 countries across Europe by 60 ECQA members. The ECQA is also enhancing its activities by expanding to all over the world (e.g. USA, Thailand, India etc.).

The ECQA ensures that the same knowledge is presented to participants across Europe and all participants are tested according to the same requirements (quality criteria). Knowledge to be provided and tested for certain professions are defined by experts from industry and research, who know best what the requirements of the market are and what the state of the art knowledge is within certain domains. These experts work in ECQA groups called Job Role Committees. The EQCA coordinates their work and provides the infrastructure and IT support.

The ECQA has developed a set of quality criteria, which are used for the certification of the following types of service providers: trainers, training organizations, exam organizations, and certification organizations. The aim is to ensure the same level of training and certification quality in all participating countries. More information about ECQA can be found at www.ecqa.org.

Relationship between processes, job roles and skills
From the European studies you can see that above 58% of the success factors to implement learning organisations depends on human factors. Figure 1 illustrates that processes require roles and roles need specific skills to efficiently perform the job. In ISO 15504 a capability level 3 would, for instance, require the definition of competence criteria per role.

Combining this approach with the learning organisation related approach leads to a framework where it becomes extremely important to think in terms of job role-based qualification and skills.

This is the reason why the following skills acquisition strategies base on specific job roles and their qualification needed to efficiently manage the development (e.g. job roles SW project manager, SW architect, etc.) and enable learning (e.g. job roles innovation manager, SPI manager, etc.).

Skill acquisition strategy
There is a set of experienced partners in 24 European countries to create a pool of knowledge for specific professions. This pool can be extended to further professions.
If there is a need a person can attend a course for a specific job role online through an advanced learning infrastructure.  See Figure 2.
You start with a self-assessment against the skills,. Then you can sign into an online course. Here you are guided by a tutor and do a homework which is being corrected by the tutor. Finally the homework and real work done in your project is sufficient to demonstrate the skills.

Moodle – This is a web-based learning management system which is public domain available. (www.moodle.com)
Capability Adviser – This is a web-based assessment portal system with a defined interface database to connect the systems.

NQA – Network Quality Assurance – This is a web-based team working tool which was developed in the EU IST 2000 28162 project.

So far the following profession have been established –

	Software Process Improvement Manager
	Business Process Manager
	Business Process Manager for Higher Education Institutions
	EU Project manager
	Social Responsibility Manager
	Sustainability Manager
	Innovation manager
	Software Architect
	Software Project Manager
	IT Consultant
	Security Manager
	Configuration Manager
	Internal Financial Control Assessor

(more existing and upcoming on the ECQA webpage)

References

Further reading
 Lessons Learned for ECQA LLP LdV Project - ScienceDirect
 M. Biro, R. Messnarz, A. Davison (2002) The Impact of National Cultures on the Effectiveness of Improvement methods - The Third Dimension, in Software Quality Professional, Volume Four, Issue Four, American Society for Quality, Sep-tember 2002
 Feuer E., Messnarz R., Wittenbrink H., Experiences With Managing Social Patterns in Defined Distributed Working Processes, in: Proceedings of the EuroSPI 2003 Conference, 10–12 December 2003, FTI Verlag, 
 Messnarz R., Nadasi G., O'Leary E., Foley B., Experience with Teamwork in Distributed Work Environments, in: Proceedings of the E2001 Conference, E-Work and E-commerce, Novel solutions for a global networked economy, eds. Brian Stanford Smith, Enrica Chiozza, IOS Press, Amsterdam, Berlin, Oxford, Tokyo, Wash-ington, 2001
 A Learning Organisation Approach for Process Improvement in the Service Sector, R. Messnarz. C. Stöckler, G. Velasco, G. O'Suilleabhain, A Learning Organisation Approach for Process Improvement in the Service Sector, in: Proceedings of the EuroSPI 1999 Conference, 25–27 October 1999, Pori, Finland
 O'Keeffe, T., & D. Harrington, 2001. Learning to Learn: An Examination of Organisational Learning in Selected Irish Multinationals. Journal of European Industrial Training, MCB University Press, Vol. 25: Number 2/3/4
 DTI - Department of Trade and Industry UK, British Standards for Occupational Qualification, National Vocational Qualification Standards and Levels
 Gemünden H.G., T. Ritter, Inter-organisational Relationships and Networks, Journal of Business Research, 2001
 R. Messnarz, et al., Assessment Based Learning centers, in : Proceedings of the EuroSPI 2006 Conference, Joensuu, Finland, Oct 2006, also published in Wiley SPIP Proceeding in June 2007

External links
 
 ISCN 

Professional associations based in Austria